Joseph Carey may refer to:
 Joseph Carey (Canadian politician) (1829–1910), former mayor of Victoria, British Columbia
 Joseph M. Carey (1845–1924), lawyer, rancher, judge and politician in Wyoming
 Joseph W. Carey (1859–1937), Irish artist
 Joe Carey (born 1975), Irish Fine Gael politician
 Joe Carey (American football) (1895–1962), American football player